Qaleh (also Romanized as Qal‘eh) is a village in Chahardangeh Rural District, Chahardangeh District, Sari County, Mazandaran Province, Iran. At the 2006 census, its population was 25, in 12 families.

References 

Populated places in Sari County